Andy David Kindler (born October 16, 1956) is an American comedian and actor from Queens, New York. He played the character "Andy", a fellow sportswriter and friend of sportswriter "Ray Barone" (Ray Romano) on the TV show Everybody Loves Raymond, was a regular guest on Late Show with David Letterman, contributor to The Daily Show, and has performed on HBO. Kindler frequently performs as a voice actor in animated television series from producer Loren Bouchard, including roles on Dr. Katz, Home Movies, and the recurring character of Mort the mortician on Bob's Burgers.

Early life and education 
Kindler was born and raised in Queens, New York. He attended Binghamton University, and originally intended on becoming a classical musician. While in college, Kindler performed in theatre productions. After graduating, Kindler moved to Los Angeles. He began performing stand-up in 1984.

Kindler is Jewish. His mother and sister died within weeks of each another sometime in the late 2010s. His mother had become a Quaker when Andy was 15 years old, according to Kindler.

Career

Stand up 
His material often covers the comedy industry itself, criticizing other comedians for being too predictable. At his annual state of the industry address at Montreal's "Just for Laughs" festival in 2012, he criticized Dane Cook, Louis C.K., Chelsea Handler, and Jay Leno.

In 2010, Kindler was a judge on the stand-up reality show Last Comic Standing. 

In 2018, he hosted the live taping of Megan Koester's comedy album "Tertium Non Datur," released in January 2019 by ASpecialThing Records. Kindler has hosted season four and five (2018–19) of the Hulu standup series Coming to the Stage.

In 1996, he offered $1 million to anyone who could produce a video in which Whoopi Goldberg was funny.

In 2010, Kindler released his first album, I Wish I Was Bitter, recorded in 2003. He followed this with Hence the Humor on May 8, 2020.

Acting 
In 2010, he appeared on several episodes of Wizards of Waverly Place as Chancellor Tootietootie.

Kindler is often thought to have portrayed the character of "Jamison" in the World Wrestling Federation, but the character was portrayed by a different actor by the name of John DiGiacomo. He plays a fictionalized version of himself in the IFC series Maron.

Kindler currently co-hosts the weekly podcast Thought Spiral with friend and fellow comedian J. Elvis Weinstein. He also appeared numerous times on The Majority Report with Sam Seder.

Filmography

References

External links

1956 births
Living people
American male comedians
American male television actors
American male voice actors
American stand-up comedians
Male actors from Los Angeles
Male actors from New York City
Place of birth missing (living people)
20th-century American male actors
21st-century American male actors
20th-century American comedians
21st-century American comedians
Comedians from California
Comedians from New York City
Jewish male comedians
Binghamton University alumni